Kitten Creek is a stream in St. Clair and Vernon counties in the U.S. state of Missouri. It is a tributary of Clear Creek.

Kitten Creek was so named because a local woman owned many pet cats.

See also
List of rivers of Missouri

References

Rivers of St. Clair County, Missouri
Rivers of Vernon County, Missouri
Rivers of Missouri